George Onslow may refer to:

George Onslow (British Army officer) (1731–1792), British politician and army officer
George Onslow, 1st Earl of Onslow (1731–1814), British peer and politician
George Onslow (composer) (1784–1853), French composer

See also
George Macarthur-Onslow (1875–1931), Australian general who served in World War I